Janet Petersen (born August 1, 1970) is an American politician and a Democratic member of the Iowa Senate representing the 18th District since January 2013.  She previously served as the Senate Minority Leader and has previously represented the 64th district in the Iowa House of Representatives between 2001 and 2013.  She received her BA from the University of Northern Iowa and her MA from Drake University.

Petersen serves on several committees in the Iowa Senate - the Government Oversight, Judiciary, State Government and Ways & Means committees. She also serves as the ranking member of the Commerce Committee. Petersen currently serves as state Senate minority leader after replacing Rob Hogg in October 2017. She is the first woman to lead the Senate Democratic caucus.

Career
Before her election to the state legislature, Petersen worked for the '92 Clinton-Gore campaign, the American Heart Association, and Strategic America, a marketing communications firm.

Since becoming a politician, much of her private work has focused on making Iowa "the safest place in the nation to have a baby". In 2004, she helped launch a stillbirth registry project that brings in more than $2 million a year to find causes and cures of stillbirths.

Electoral history
*incumbent

References

External links

Senator Janet Petersen official Iowa General Assembly site

|-

|-

|-

1970 births
21st-century American politicians
21st-century American women politicians
American Disciples of Christ
Drake University alumni
Democratic Party Iowa state senators
Living people
Democratic Party members of the Iowa House of Representatives
Politicians from Des Moines, Iowa
University of Northern Iowa alumni
Women state legislators in Iowa